An electro-diesel locomotive (also referred to as a dual-mode or bi-mode locomotive) is a type of locomotive that can be powered either from an electricity supply (like an electric locomotive) or by using the onboard diesel engine (like a diesel-electric locomotive). For the most part, these locomotives are built to serve regional, niche markets with a very specific purpose.

Overview

Electro-diesel locomotives are used to provide continuous journeys along routes that are only partly electrified without a change of locomotive, avoid extensive running of diesel under the wires (using a diesel locomotive where electrified lines are available), and giving solution where diesel engines are banned.  They may be designed or adapted mainly for electric use, mainly for diesel use or to work well as either electric or diesel.

Note that, as well as the electric multiple unit (EMU) and diesel multiple unit (DMU), where no discrete locomotive is present, an electro-diesel (bi-mode) multiple unit train is called electro-diesel multiple unit (EDMU) or bi-mode multiple unit (BMU).

Primarily electric

This is effectively an electric locomotive with a relatively small auxiliary diesel prime mover intended only for low-speed or short-distance operation (e.g. British Rail Class 73). Some of these, such as the British Rail Class 74, were converted from electric locomotives. The Southern Region of British Railways used these locomotives to cross non-electrified gaps and to haul boat trains that used tramways at the ports of Southampton and Weymouth. For economy, the diesel engine and its generator are considerably smaller than the electric capacity. Despite this large difference, their comparable tractive efforts were much closer (around three-quarters as diesels) and so they could start and work equally heavy trains as diesels, but not to the same speeds.

Primarily diesel
This is effectively a diesel locomotive with auxiliary electric motors (or connections to the existing traction motors), usually operating from 750 V DC third rail where non-electric traction is banned (e.g. EMD FL9, GE Genesis P32AC-DM, EMD DM30AC).  The primary function for these models is to provide a "one-seat ride" (a rail trip that doesn't require a transfer to a different train) between the electrified and non-electrified sections of a rail system or to allow trains to run through tunnels or other segments of track where diesel locomotives are generally prohibited due to their production of exhaust; such locomotives are used for certain trains servicing the New York City terminals of Grand Central Terminal and Penn Station, as the various rail tunnels into Manhattan have exhaust restrictions.  Once out of the tunnels, the engines are started and operation is as a normal diesel locomotive.

Full dual-mode
With modern electronics, it is much easier to construct (or adapt) an electro-diesel locomotive or multiple-unit which is equally at home running at high speeds both "under the wires" and under diesel power (e.g. British Rail Class 88, Bombardier ALP-45DP).  These will normally operate under pure electric traction where possible, and use the diesel engines to extend the journeys along non-electrified sections which would not be cost effective to electrify.  They may also be used on long cross-country routes to take advantage of shorter sections of electrified main lines.

Europe

Germany

 Gmeinder class 478.6 diesel and  third-rail (bottom contact).
 Voith Futura, a 2009 CREAM Project concept locomotive rebuilt from DB 240 002.
 Bombardier TRAXX "Last Mile Diesel", mainly electric. Orders signed 2010, to be delivered probably 2012.
Siemens Vectron Dual Mode

Poland

 Pesa 111Ed Gama Marathon – mainly electric, with auxiliary diesel engine enabling last-mile operation on non-electrified tracks. Gama Marathon was first presented in 2012 at InnoTrans Berlin. The locomotive then underwent a series of tests with rail operators Lotos Kolej (in goods traffic) and PKP Intercity (in passenger traffic), after successful conclusion it was offered on the market. In July 2015 the Polish train-operating company Locomotiv bought the prototype and signed order for further two Marathons.
 Newag Dragon – version of this electric freight locomotive for the Freightliner's Polish branch, Freightliner PL Sp. z o.o. (five units delivered in 2016) is equipped with auxiliary diesel engine.
 Newag Griffin – a version of this electric freight locomotive, leased to Lotos Kolej in 2017 for 7 years with a provision to extend the lease, is equipped with auxiliary diesel engine.

Spain
 FEVE 1.900 Series,  overhead wires. This series is a rebuild of FEVE 1.000 Series locomotive.
 Euskotren TD2000 series,  overhead wires. This is a new construction locomotive. Built by CFD-Bagnères and Ingeteam.
 CAF Bitrac 3600,  overhead wires.  October 2007 order for nine freight Co-Co locomotives.  Available in Bo-Bo and Co-Co wheel configuration,  gauge, and as freight or passenger versions of  maximum speeds respectively.
 Power cars for RENFE Class 730, by Talgo.

Switzerland

 Rhaetian Railway Gem 4/4 801 and 802,  overhead wires (Bernina Railway)
 Swiss Federal Railways Tem I 251–275 (1950–57), Tem II 276–298 (1967) and Tem III 321–365 (1954–62) shunters (Tem III see image) of which only few are still in service.
 Swiss Federal Railways Eem 923 shunters using both  and  overhead wires and a 360 kW auxiliary diesel engine are on delivery from Stadler Rail's Winterthur plant.

United Kingdom
An experimental electro-diesel locomotive, DEL120, was built by London Underground in 1940 but was not a success. Two types have been built whose electricity source was a 750V DC third rail.

 British Rail Class 73, dating from 1962 – the more successful design, with some still in regular use. They originally had lower power output in the diesel mode, but are re-engined to provide more power. (2020,  years since introduction)
 British Rail Class 74 – rebuilt from British Rail Class 71 electric locomotives in 1967 and withdrawn by 1977.

Electro-diesel locomotives whose electricity source is  overhead line include:
 British Rail Class 88 – locomotive used by Direct Rail Services. Introduced in 2017.

Russia

In Russia, a number of electro-diesels were built which had both pantographs and diesel prime movers. These included:

 ED16 (ЭД16), ED18 (ЭД18), and TEU1 (ТЭУ1) narrow gauge models
 OPE1 (ОПЭ1), OPE2 (ОПЭ2), NP1 (НП1), PE2(M) (РЭ2(М)), and EL20 standard-gauge locomotives used mostly in quarries

Warnings: the sections below are WORK IN PROGRESS, result of moving to "Electro-diesel multiple unit" the informations about Electro-diesel Multiple Unit, here incorrectly reported; please give help on this transfer.

North America

Canada
 Bombardier ALP-45DP – 20 locomotives ordered for the Mascouche line (Exo) in a joint order with NJ Transit.  They provide a through journey on this mostly unelectrified new line, which joins the existing electrified Deux-Montagnes line to access Montreal's Central Station through the poorly ventilated,  electric only Mount Royal Tunnel. With the conversion of the Deux-Montagnes line into the mainline of the Réseau express métropolitain light metro system and the permanent truncation of the Mascouche line to Ahuntsic station starting in January 2020, the ALP-45DPs will be run exclusively in diesel mode.

United States

Several, primarily diesel locomotive types and a multiple-unit have been built to operate off a  third rail into the New York City terminals of Grand Central Terminal and Penn Station (with the third rail system being rarely used on open-air tracks).

The following are in service:
 P32AC-DM – dual-mode version of GE Genesis, primarily diesel, electric mode is only used for service to Grand Central Terminal from Poughkeepsie or Wassaic, or Penn Station from Albany, Rutland, or Niagara Falls. They are also used on the Albany-New York section of trains between Penn Station and Chicago, Montreal, and Toronto. Those trains stop in Albany to switch to full diesel GE Geneses for the remainder of the journey.
 EMD DM30AC – specific to Long Island Rail Road, primary diesel, electric mode is only used for service to Penn Station.
 Bombardier ALP-45DP – 35 locomotives purchased by NJ Transit (with 17 more on order), to bridge gaps between non-electrified and electrified sections of track into New York Penn Station. These trains have been used to provide a "one-seat ride" to New York Penn Station both for commuters using non-electrified portions of the system.

The following were retired from New York City service:
 Baldwin RP-210 – primarily diesel-hydraulic, third-rail electric mode for short-term use only. All scrapped.
 "Roger Williams" - streamlined 6-car lightweight DMU passenger train, built by Budd Company in 1956 for New York, New Haven and Hartford Railroad; primarily diesel-hydraulic, third-rail electric mode for short-term use only. Three cars preserved.
 Fairbanks Morse P-12-42 – primarily diesel-electric, third-rail electric mode for short-term use only. All scrapped.
 EMD FL9 – primarily diesel-electric, third-rail electric mode for short-term use only. Several examples preserved and/or in service on heritage railroads.
 GE three-power boxcab - tri-mode switcher locomotive model built in 1930, was also capable of operating as a battery locomotive. All retired and scrapped.
 GE/Garrett gas turbine MUs - primarily electric, but built with gas turbines to allow operation outside of third rail electrification. All scrapped.

Africa

South Africa

 The South African Class 38-000 is a  electro-diesel locomotive designed by Consortium under the leadership of Siemens and built by Union Carriage and Wagon (UCW) in Nigel, Gauteng, South Africa. Between November 1992 and 1993 fifty of these locomotives were placed in service by Spoornet, formerly the South African Railways (SAR) and later renamed Transnet Freight Rail (TFR).  The diesel engine enables the locomotive to shunt on unelectrified sidings.

Tanzania
 Stadler Euro Dual, proposed  overhead wires (Tanzania Standard Gauge Railway)

Asia

India
The Indian Railways WDAP-5 is a class of Electro-diesel locomotive that was developed in 2019 by Banaras Locomotive Works (BLW), Varanasi for Indian Railways. The model name stands for broad gauge (W), Diesel (D), AC Current (A), Passenger (P) and 5000 Horsepower(5). The locomotive can deliver 5000HP in electric mode and 4500HP in diesel mode. Since 2016, Indian Railways has pushed for greater electrification of the railway network. In this interest, the government approved plans for 100% electrification in 2019. So far Indian Railways has electrified 39,866 RKMs which accounts for about 63% of the total route kilometres. Using electric locomotives allows the railways to save time by giving a faster acceleration and also saves fuel costs. However, these advantages are offset under certain circumstances where the route of the train is partly electrified. In such cases, trains used to run with a diesel locomotive in non-electrified sections and would be switched with an electric locomotive as soon as they enter an electrified section. Instead of the benefits of electrification, Railways observed a loss of punctuality in such trains due to valuable time being lost to switch between diesel and electric locomotives. To counter this, in August 2019, Railways issued a circular, asking all zones to haul trains with a diesel locomotive if their route was not completely electrified. This meant that electrification of railway lines, unless completed end-to-end, did not provide any advantage. This problem had been identified by the Railways, way back in 2016, which is when RDSO was requested to study the feasibility of dual-mode locomotives as a stop-gap until 100% electrification was achieved.

Hybrid locomotive

A specialized type of electro-diesel locomotive is the hybrid locomotive.  Here, the electricity comes from a battery charged by the diesel engine rather than from an external supply.  An example is the Green Goat switcher GG20B by Railpower Technologies, a subsidiary of R.J. Corman Railroad Group since 2009.

See also
 Biodiesel
 Dual-mode bus - the bus equivalent
 GE "Three-Power" boxcab
 Hitachi Super Express, a future train for the United Kingdom
 Electro-diesel multiple unit

References

External links

 Novocherkasskiy electric locomotive factory – Model OPE1
CAF website
Drehstromloks.de